Miles of Fire, The Burning Miles' or The Fiery Miles' (translit.  Ognennye versty) is an early Red Western filmed by Samson Samsonov in 1957.  Often considered the earliest of the 'Red Westerns' (or 'Osterns'), it was made before the term was coined.  The film is a Russian civil war drama, focusing on the conflict between the Reds and the Whites.

One-time Mosfilm actor Samsonov had a versatile directorial career prior to The Burning Miles, fresh from an adaptation of Chekhov's The Grasshopper that won two prizes at the Venice Film Festival.  He was later awarded the title of 'People's Artist of the USSR'.

Plot summary
The White Guard Army led by General Anton Denikin are laying siege to a southern city in order to prevent a rebellion.  They are also blocking the railway, but Chekist Zavragin is in a hurry to travel south.  In a flash of inspiration, he decides to use tachankas or machine gun carts to reach his destination, and attracts an unusual group of equally desperate fellow travellers.

The Burning Miles is influenced by railroad Western films like John Ford's classic Stagecoach, because of the diverse set of characters thrown together in desperate circumstances.  Zavragin's companions on his journey include the doctor Shelako, the nurse Katya and a mysterious white guard officer Beklemishev, disguised as a veterinary surgeon.  This formula gives the film an extra psychological dimension as the characters' progress towards their destination echoes the resolution of their problems and transitions in relationships.

Main cast
Igor Savkin (Grigory Fyodorovich Zavragin) 
Margarita Volodina (Katerina Gavrilovna)
Mikhail Troyanovsky (Dr. Shelako)
Vladimir Kenigson (Sergei Beklemishev)

References

External links

 , the official Mosfilm channel

1957 films
Ostern films
Soviet historical films
Mosfilm films
1950s Russian-language films
Films directed by Samson Samsonov
Russian Civil War films
1957 Western (genre) films
1950s historical films